Maritime Jewel was a double-hulled oil tanker launched in 1999 and completed in 2000. Entering service that year, the ship was known as MV Limburg until 2003. The  ship carried crude oil between ports in Iran and Malaysia. One crew member was killed and twelve more wounded in the attack. Four days after the attack, the tanker was towed to Dubai where she was repaired and renamed Maritime Jewel. Maritime Jewel was broken up for scrap at Chittagong, Bangladesh on 15 May 2018.

Description
The ship's gross tonnage (GT) was 157,833 tons, with a deadweight tonnage (DWT) of 299,364 tons and a net tonnage (NT) of 108,708 tons.

History
Limburgs keel was laid down on 24 May 1999 and the ship was launched on 28 August 1999. Limburg was completed on 5 January 2000 and entered service that year.

Bombing
On 6 October 2002, Limburg was carrying  of crude oil from Saudi Arabia to Malaysia, and was in the Gulf of Aden off Yemen to pick up another load of oil. She was registered under a French flag and had been chartered by the Malaysian petrol firm Petronas. While she was 3 km off the port of Al-Shihr, suicide bombers rammed an explosives-laden dinghy into the starboard side of the tanker. Although Yemeni officials initially claimed that the explosion was caused by an accident, later investigations found traces of TNT on the damaged ship.

One crew member was killed, and twelve other crew members were injured. The fire was extinguished, and four days later Limburg was towed to Dubai, United Arab Emirates. The ship was renamed Maritime Jewel, bought by Tanker Pacific, and repaired at Dubai Drydocks from March to August 2003. The attack caused the short-term collapse of international shipping in the Gulf of Aden and as a result, cost Yemen $3.8 million a month in port revenues.

Responsibility
Al Qaeda claimed responsibility for the attack on the Jehad.net website, which has since been shut down. Abd al-Rahim al-Nashiri, who allegedly also masterminded the USS Cole bombing, was charged by US military prosecutors for planning the attack. Osama bin Laden issued a statement, which read:
 

On 3 February 2006, Fawaz Yahya al-Rabeiee, who had been sentenced to death for the Limburg attack, and 22 other suspected or convicted Al-Qaeda members escaped from jail in Yemen. Among them was Jamal al-Badawi, who masterminded the USS Cole bombing of 12 October 2000. Of the 23 escapees, 13 had been convicted of the Cole and Limburg bombings. On 1 October 2006, al-Rabeiee and Mohammed Daylami were shot and killed by Yemeni security forces during raids on two buildings in the capital Sana'a. One of al-Rabeiee's accomplices was also arrested during the raids. In February 2014 Ahmed al-Darbi pleaded guilty before the Guantanamo military commission to helping plan several maritime terrorist attacks including the Limburg attack. By the time of the attack, al-Darbi was already detained at Guantanamo.

Fate
Maritime Jewel was broken up for scrap at Chittagong, Bangladesh on 1 May 2018.

References

External links
 Yemen ship attack 'was terrorism' (BBC)
 "Interpol issues global alert after Al-Qaeda prison break in Yemen"  (Channelnewsasia)
 Repairs post 2002 terrorist attack off Yemen (Google + photo album)

1999 ships
2002 in Yemen
2002 murders in Asia
Al-Qaeda attacks
Islamic terrorist incidents in 2002
Islamic terrorism in Yemen
Maritime incidents in 2002
Murder in Yemen
October 2002 crimes
October 2002 events in Asia
Oil spills in Asia
Oil tankers
Ship bombings
Suicide bombings in 2002
Suicide bombings in Yemen
Terrorist incidents against shipping
Terrorist incidents in Asia in 2002
Terrorist incidents in Yemen in the 2000s